John-Olof Persson (1938–1989), often called "John-Olle", was a Swedish politician. He was a member of the Swedish Social Democratic Party, and Mayor of Stockholm 1973-1976 and 1979-1986.

From 1983 to 1986, Persson was the president of the Swedish Association of Local Authorities (Svenska Kommunförbundet), an association that existed from 1969 to 2007 (now the Swedish Association of Regions) to interact with the Riksdag of Sweden.

Persson died in an airplane accident in Oskarshamn, Sweden in 1989.

1938 births
1989 deaths
Mayors of Stockholm
Swedish Social Democratic Party politicians
Municipal commissioners of Sweden
Victims of aviation accidents or incidents in Sweden
20th-century Swedish people